James Beverley Sener (May 18, 1837 – November 18, 1903) was a U.S. Representative from Virginia and the third Chief Justice of the Supreme Court of the Wyoming Territory.

Biography
Born in Fredericksburg, Virginia, Sener attended private schools and in 1859 was graduated from the University of Virginia at Charlottesville.  He earned a law degree from Washington College (now Washington and Lee University) at Lexington in 1860.  He was admitted to the bar the same year and commenced practice in Fredericksburg, Virginia.  He became Sheriff of Fredericksburg in 1860, and was Sergeant of the city of Fredericksburg 1863–1865.

He served as Army correspondent of the Southern Associated Press with the army of Gen. Robert E. Lee.  He became editor of the Fredericksburg (Virginia) Ledger in 1865.  He served as delegate to the Republican National Convention in 1872.

Sener was elected as a Republican to the Forty-third Congress (March 4, 1873 – March 3, 1875) after defeating Democrat Everitt M. Braxton.  He served as chairman of the Committee on Expenditures in the Department of Justice (Forty-third Congress).  He was an unsuccessful candidate for reelection in 1874 to the Forty-fourth Congress.  He resumed the practice of his profession.  He served as chief justice of Wyoming Territory 1879–1884.
He died in Washington, D.C., on November 18, 1903.  He was interred in Citizens Cemetery, Fredericksburg, Virginia.

Sources

1837 births
1903 deaths
Politicians from Fredericksburg, Virginia
Virginia lawyers
Washington and Lee University alumni
American war correspondents
Republican Party members of the United States House of Representatives from Virginia
19th-century American politicians
Chief Justices of the Wyoming Supreme Court
19th-century American judges